The 1980–81 Superliga Espanola de Hockey Hielo season was the ninth season of the Superliga Espanola de Hockey Hielo, the top level of ice hockey in Spain. Eight teams participated in the league, and CH Casco Viejo Bilbao won the championship.

Final round

Relegation

External links
Season on hockeyarchives.info

Spain
Liga Nacional de Hockey Hielo seasons
Liga